Sirkiä is a Finnish surname. Notable people with the surname include:

Mauri Olavi Sirkiä (born 1947), Finnish chess master
Raimo Sirkiä (born 1951), Finnish operatic tenor
Viktor Sirkiä (born 1949), Finnish weightlifter

Finnish-language surnames